Turkish singer Sıla's discography consists of seven studio albums, two compilation albums, three promo singles and 32 music videos. She started her career by working as a backing vocalist for Kenan Doğulu, and in the late 2007, she released her first studio album Sıla. With its lead single, "...Dan Sonra", which topped Turkey's music charts, she became a well-known singer in Turkey. After a year, she collaborated with the Colombian group Ciclon on their album Shaker and a music video was made for one of its songs "Yaz Geliyor Heyoo".

In March 2009, Sıla released her second studio album İmza. The song "Sevişmeden Uyumayalım" from this album ranked number-one on Turkey's national music charts; "İnşallah", "Yara Bende" and "Bana Biraz Renk Ver" were also among the top five on the music charts in Turkey. In June 2010, she was featured on Ozan Doğulu's song "Alain Delon", which became a hit inside Turkey. By the end of the year, her third studio album, Konuşmadığımız Şeyler Var, was released, which included the number-one songs "Acısa da Öldürmez", "Kafa" and "Boş Yere". Konuşmadığımız Şeyler Var sold more than 100,000 copies in Turkey.

In June 2012, Sıla released a compilation album titled Joker. New versions of her songs from her previous albums were included in this compilation album. In  October 2012, her fourth studio album, Vaveyla, was released, which sold more than 84,000 copies. Separate music videos were made for the songs "İmkânsız", "Zor Sevdiğimden" and "Aslan Gibi" from this album. In February 2014, her fifth studio album, Yeni Ay, was released and sold 158,041 copies inside Turkey. Four music videos were made for the songs "Vaziyetler", "Yabancı", "Reverans" and "Hediye". She released her sixth album in 2016, titled Mürekkep.

Albums

Studio albums

Compilation albums

EPs

Split albums

Charts

Other works

Music videos

References

External links
Sıla discography - official website

Discographies of Turkish artists
Pop music discographies